The Chromatic Fantasia and Fugue in D minor, is a work for harpsichord by Johann Sebastian Bach. Bach probably composed it during his time in Köthen from 1717 to 1723. The piece was already regarded as a unique masterpiece during his lifetime. It is now often played on piano.

Sources
An autograph of this work is not known. The musicologist Walther Siegmund-Schultze pinpoints the work to the "fermenting Köthen works" because of its improvisatory and expressive nature, using all keys.

At least 16 different handwritten copies of the score are extant, including five from Bach's lifetime. The oldest copy is only an early, two-bar shorter variant of the fantasia. It was written by Bach's pupil Johann Tobias Krebs and was created after 1717, close to the time of origin. Two other copies emerged around 1730 that include the fugue; they were possibly written by Gottfried Grünewald or Christoph Graupner. A copy of the double work comes from Johann Friedrich Agricola and was written between 1738 and 1740. A manuscript from 1750 is extant, and a complete copy by Johann Nikolaus Forkel (1800). From these two manuscripts come the first printed editions of the piece by Franz Anton Hoffmeister (1802) and Friedrich Konrad Griepenkerl (1819). Because of significant differences in details, which can not be traced back to a common basic shape, it is assumed that Bach himself composed the various different versions of the work that are in circulation.

Structure

Because of its characteristics the piece became known as Chromatic, a term that did not originate with Bach.

Fantasia
The chromatic fantasia begins as a toccata with fast, up and down surging runs in thirty-second notes (demisemiquavers) and broken chords in sixteenth-note (semiquaver) triplets, which are often diminished seventh chords lined up in semitones. The second part is a series of very clear and remotely modulating soft leading chords that are written in the oldest copies as "Arpeggio", i.e. they require a spread chord. The third part is entitled Recitative and includes a variety of ornamented, enriched, highly expressive melodies. This part contains several enharmonic equivalents. The recitative finishes with passages that are chromatically sinking diminished seventh chords over above the pedal point on D.

Fugue
The theme of the fugue consists of an ascending half-step line from A to C, here from the third to the fifth of D minor to the relative major key of F major.

Reception and interpretation
The virtuosic and improvisational toccata style of the fantasy, in which both hands alternate rapidly, the expressive, tonally experimental character and the key of D minor put the work alongside the famous Toccata and Fugue in D minor, BWV 565. Both works are exceptional and therefore particularly popular compositions in Bach's keyboard music. This assessment was shared by Bach's contemporaries. The first biographer of Bach, Johann Nikolaus Forkel, wrote: "I have expended much effort to find another piece of this type by Bach. But it was in vain. This fantasy is unique and has always been second to none."

19th-century interpretations of the piece are exemplars of the romantic approach to Bach's works taken during that period. Felix Mendelssohn, the founder of the Bach revival, played this fantasy in February 1840 and 1841 in a series of concerts at the Leipzig Gewandhaus and delighted the audience. He attributed this effect to the free interpretation of the fantasy's arpeggios. He used the sound effects of the era's grand piano through differentiated dynamics, accentuating high notes and doubling pedal bass notes. This interpretation became the model for the adagio of Mendelssohn's second sonata for cello and Piano (Op. 58), written from 1841 to 1843. This work gives the top notes of the piano arpeggios a chorale melody while the cello plays an extended recitative resembling that of the Chromatic Fantasia and quotes its final passage.

This romantic interpretation was formative; many famous pianists and composers, including Franz Liszt and Johannes Brahms, used the work as a demonstration of virtuosity and expressiveness in their concert repertoire. It was reprinted in many editions with interpretive notes and scale instructions. Max Reger reworked the piece for the organ. Even since the rise of the historically informed performance movement, it remains one of the most popular keyboard works by Bach.

There are romantic interpretations by Edwin Fischer, Wilhelm Kempff, Samuil Feinberg and Alfred Brendel on the grand piano, and by Wanda Landowska on the harpsichord. A non-romantic interpretation with surprising accents and without pedalling was presented by Glenn Gould and influenced more recent pianists such as András Schiff and Alexis Weissenberg. The pianist Agi Jambor combined romantic sonorities and colors with clear voice guidance and emphasized the work's structural relations. Around 1944, Kaikhosru Shapurji Sorabji composed a virtuosic paraphrase of the fantasy as the 99th of his 100 Transcendental Studies.

Transcriptions
The work has been transcribed for solo viola by Zoltán Kodály in 1950. There is a transcription for classical guitar by Philip Hii, and Busoni made two transcriptions for both solo piano and cello and piano, which are catalogued as BV B 31 and 38, respectively. Jaco Pastorius played the opening parts on electric bass on his 1981 album Word of Mouth. A transcription for solo cello was made by cellist Johann Sebastian Paetsch in 2015 and published by the Hofmeister Musikverlag in Leipzig. A transcription for solo clarinet of the fantasy was done by Stanley Hasty, professor emeritus of University of Rochester's Eastman School of Music, in 2002.

Literature 
Urtext edition
 Rudolf Steglich (ed.): Johann Sebastian Bach: Chromatische Fantasie und Fuge d-moll BWV 903: Urtext without fingerings. G. Henle, 2009, 
 Ulrich Leisinger (ed.): Johann Sebastian Bach: Chromatische Fantasie + Fuge (BWV 903/903a). Klavier, Cembalo. Wiener Urtext Edition, Schott Verlag, 
 Heinrich Schenker: J.S. Bach's Chromatic Fantasy and Fugue: Critical Edition With Commentary. Longman Music Series, Schirmer Books 1984, 

Musical analysis
 Martin Geck (ed.): Bach-Interpretationen. Vandenhoeck und Ruprecht, 2nd edition, Göttingen 1982,  and 213–215
 Stefan Drees: Vom Sprechen der Instrumente: Zur Geschichte des instrumentalen Rezitativs. Peter Lang, Frankfurt am Main 2007,

References

External links 

Kerstin Unseld, SWR2: "Die Einzigartige" (One of a Kind). (In German.) Includes live performance of BWV 903 by pianist Evgeni Koroliov as SWR2's Musikstück der Woche for April 5–11, 2010.
Bach Digital Work No.  at bachdigital.de

Fugues by Johann Sebastian Bach
Compositions for harpsichord
Bach
Compositions in D minor